Diego Sebastián Menghi (born 17 May 1985, in Justiniano Posse) is an Argentine footballer, who plays as a centre-back.

Career
Menghi began his professional playing career in 2006 with Racing Club de Avellaneda. He made his debut in the Primera División in a 0-2 home defeat to Vélez Sarsfiels on 11 February 2006. He scored his first goal for the club to earn a 1-0 home win against San Lorenzo on 28 March 2006.

In 2008, he joined 2nd division side Atlético de Rafaela on loan. He helped the club to achieve a 3rd-place finish and earn a playoff place against Gimnasia de La Plata, he played in both legs of the playoff that finished 3-3 on aggregate meaning that Rafaela were not promoted. After this disappointment he returned to Racing but has failed to earn back a place in the first team. At the beginning of 2010 he was released by the club.

In 2010, he's plays for San Luis Quillota.

External links
 
 
  
 

1985 births
Living people
Sportspeople from Córdoba Province, Argentina
Argentine footballers
Argentine expatriate footballers
Association football defenders
Racing Club de Avellaneda footballers
Atlético de Rafaela footballers
San Luis de Quillota footballers
Correcaminos UAT footballers
Atlético Venezuela C.F. players
Alebrijes de Oaxaca players
Tampico Madero F.C. footballers
Deportivo Capiatá players
Chacarita Juniors footballers
Club Atlético Colegiales (Argentina) players
Argentine Primera División players
Primera Nacional players
Chilean Primera División players
Ascenso MX players
Venezuelan Primera División players
Paraguayan Primera División players
Argentine expatriate sportspeople in Chile
Argentine expatriate sportspeople in Mexico
Argentine expatriate sportspeople in Venezuela
Argentine expatriate sportspeople in Paraguay
Expatriate footballers in Chile
Expatriate footballers in Mexico
Expatriate footballers in Venezuela
Expatriate footballers in Paraguay